

List

Notes

a.   Also advertised in publicity material with Ydral 125 cc  or Sachs 200 cc  or Maico 250 cc  engines. The 250 cc  version has four wheels, all others have three.
b.   One other model was listed in publicity material, 'The Avolette Compétition' with streamlined bodywork and a Maico 250 cc  engine. It is not known if any were built.
c.    Replaced in 1948 with a 589 cc  DKW engine.
d.    Sales literature suggested 125 cc, 250 cc or 350 cc engines were available.

References

F